William Hooper School is a historic school building located on Mears Street between South 4th and South 5th Streets in Wilmington, New Hanover County, North Carolina. It was designed by Joseph F. Leitner's firm and is described as being in a Classical Revival style. It was built by Wallace & Osterman in 1914. Eliza Meares (1864-1926) was the school's first principal, serving from 1914 to 1925. The school closed in 1984 and in 1998 the building was converted to apartments for the elderly. It is named for William Hooper (1742-1790) of Boston, Massachusetts, who was a representative of North Carolina and signed the Declaration of Independence.

It was listed on the National Register of Historic Places in 1998.

References

School buildings on the National Register of Historic Places in North Carolina
Neoclassical architecture in North Carolina
Former school buildings in the United States
School buildings completed in 1914
Schools in Wilmington, North Carolina
National Register of Historic Places in New Hanover County, North Carolina
1984 disestablishments in North Carolina
Defunct schools in North Carolina
1914 establishments in North Carolina